Risso Mall is a shopping mall, located in the Lince district of Peru, near Arequipa Avenue.  It's a very old shopping mall, that used to belong to Lince as cotton fields but was then bought by the Risso family.  This mall was recently remodeled to include a supermarket chain (Plaza Vea), a cinema chain (Cineplanet), a casino, McDonald's, and some small shops.

References 
 http://www.rpp.com.pe/portada/agenda_empresarial/22973_1.php (in Spanish)

Shopping malls in Peru
Buildings and structures in Lima
Economy of Lima